The Dijkgraaf is a partly disappeared water course to the north of the city of Wageningen, and in the municipality of the same name.

Canals in the Netherlands
Canals in Gelderland
Wageningen